Hikosanoagonum is a genus of ground beetles in the family Carabidae. There are about five described species in Hikosanoagonum, found in Japan.

Species
These five species belong to the genus Hikosanoagonum:
 Hikosanoagonum bungo Morita & Y.Ito, 2015
 Hikosanoagonum latius Ueno, 1964
 Hikosanoagonum mutsuomiyatakei (Habu, 1974)
 Hikosanoagonum shirozui (Habu, 1954)
 Hikosanoagonum yakuense (Habu, 1974)

References

Platyninae